Johannes Vodnianus Campanus (also Ionnes Campanus Vodnianus, Jan z Vodňan or Jan Kampánus Vodňanský) (27 December 1572 – 13 December 1622) was a Czech humanist, composer, pedagogue, poet, and dramatist. He was born in Vodňany (hence his surname), in southern Bohemia. He studied at the University of Prague and in 1596 and was made Master of Liberal Arts there. He became a teacher in Prague and Kutná Hora. From 1603 he taught Greek and Latin at the University of Prague. He also taught history and Latin poetry. He was repeatedly appointed as dean, prorector, and rector of this university.

Campanus was a Hussite before renouncing this faith and becoming a Catholic in 1622.

Works
Campanus usually wrote his works in Latin, but also wrote occasionally in Czech, Greek, and German. Some of his works, like the play Břetislav und Jitka (Bretislaus) (1614), were forbidden, because they were critical of the dukes of Bohemia. His works were recognized in Europe for their metrical perfection.

Campanus' first collection of musical works, Sacrarum odarum libri duo, was published in Frankfurt in 1613. The Sacrarum odarum, which includes Rorando coeli, contains primarily short vocal works set in a simple, homorhythmic style.

Turcicorum tyrannorum qui inde usque ab Otomanno rebus Turcicis praefuerunt, descriptio (1597)
Heilige Oden/Posvátné ódy (Umdichtung der Psalmen Davids/Přebásnění Davidových žalmů)
Cechias (a history of Bohemia in verse form)
Bretislaus (play)
Elegie der Angst (Elegie o strachu)
Bitte um Frieden (Prosba o mír)

His chants include:

Ad Jehovam
Ad puelli Jesuki cunas
Rorando coeli: Rorando coeli has two choirs. They imitate one another throughout. The double choir technique utilized in this motet evokes the more complex antiphonal works of Campanus' contemporaries in Venice.

Poems
Tristitia (In lectulo quaero meo)
Surge iam linquens (Surge iam linquens thalamum tepentem)

These were published in 1612, and can be found in the Cantica canticorum in Odaria, LIII, od. 17. They were set to music by Jan Novák in the twentieth century.

Death and legacy
He died in Prague. A historical novel was published about him in 1909 by Zikmund Winter, called Mistr Kampanus: historický obraz.

Sources
University of Mannheim biographical source 
University of Mannheim source 
Lawrence Kaptein, Rorando Coeli
The Lied and Art Song Texts Page
Medieval literature
Laudatio Mansfeldiana aneb "Zrádci Plzáci" 
World Catalogue Libraries

External links

1572 births
1622 deaths
16th-century Bohemian people
17th-century Bohemian people
16th-century Bohemian writers
17th-century Bohemian writers
16th-century classical composers
17th-century classical composers
Czech Renaissance humanists
Hussite people
Czech poets
Czech male poets
Czech composers
Czech male composers
Choral composers
Rectors of Charles University
Charles University alumni
People from Vodňany
Renaissance composers